Sukhoi-Gulfstream S-21 was a projected Russian-American supersonic business jet.

In the early 1990s, Gulfstream Aerospace and the Sukhoi Design Bureau began a joint effort to develop a supersonic small business jet, code named the S-21. Due to questionable market demand for commercial supersonic air travel, commitment to the project weakened and delays mounted.

Gulfstream eventually dissolved the partnership, although Sukhoi continued work on the S-21.

The S-21 would be capable of sustained cruise at Mach 2+ and much research and development has gone into the management of the troublesome transonic effects phenomena associated with near Mach 1 air speeds.

As of 2012, the project had not received any funding for the 2013-2025 development period and appeared to be cancelled.

Specifications (S-21)

See also

References

External links

Abandoned civil aircraft projects
2000s Russian business aircraft
S-21
Supersonic business jets
Trijets
2000s United States business aircraft